Athgaon is a locality in Guwahati with nearest Railway station and airport at Paltan Bazaar and Borjhar respectively. It is an important commercial area within city and large business houses are set up here. Due to central location it is accessible from all parts of city with regular city buses and other modes of transportation.

See also
 Pan Bazaar
 Ganeshguri
 Bhangagarh

References

  

Neighbourhoods in Guwahati